Markus Merk (born 15 March 1962) is a former top-level German football referee. He is a six-time winner of the German Referee of the Year Award and the record holder in games refereed in the Bundesliga. In 2005, Merk was awarded the German Bundesverdienstkreuz (Federal Cross of Merit) in recognition of his service to football and his charity work in India. He ended his career by refereeing the match between Bayern Munich and Hertha BSC Berlin on the last day of the 2007–08 Bundesliga season on 17 May 2008.

He was ranked the best referee by the International Federation of Football History & Statistics in 2004, 2005 and 2008.

He is currently a pundit for Sky Deutschland and was the main referee commentator of the Turkish football channel Lig TV (which has the rights of the Turkish Super League) in 2010–2011 season.

Bundesliga career
In 1988, Merk was appointed the youngest Bundesliga referee ever, aged 25, representing his home club 1. FC Kaiserslautern. He became a FIFA referee four years later, and officiated at the 1992 Summer Olympics in Barcelona. In the following years, Merk established himself as a headstrong, reliable referee. He was elected an unprecedented six times as German Referee of the Year.

UEFA career
Merk's refereeing of the final match of UEFA Euro 2004 was strongly opposed by Portugal. Portugal's opponent was Greece, whose team's coach, Otto Rehhagel, was a dental patient of Merk. Nevertheless, Merk received worldwide recognition for his excellent refereeing in this game.

On 21 April 2004, during a Champions League semi-finals match against former team Porto, Jorge Andrade, Deportivo's defender, was sent off by Merk for a kick on Deco. The gesture was of a friendly nature, but the referee was eluded by it, and immediately gave the defender his marching orders. He was forced to serve a one-match ban. Eventually Jose Mourinho's team would qualify to the final.

In the 2004–05 Champions League quarter-finals he whistled the second leg game between AC Milan and Inter Milan and controversially dissalowed the goal from Inter-player Esteban Cambiasso, which led to Inter-fans throwing bottles and flares onto the pitch and the game was eventually abandoned.

Another controversial moment came in the 71st minute of a match between Artmedia and Porto on 6 December 2005, when Merk overlooked a handball by Pepe in the penalty area. If given and scored, the penalty would have sent Artmedia through to the round of 16.

FIFA career
Merk was referee in the 1992 Olympics (two call-ups), fourth official in the 1993 World Cup qualifier between the Netherlands and England (During this match Merk repeatedly restrained the furious England manager Graham Taylor, when a penalty and red card decision had gone against England. Taylor felt Ronald Koeman should have been sent off and England have a penalty for a professional foul on David Platt. Neither happened and Koeman went on to score against England. Taylor was furious at the referee, though years later, in an interview with the Observer, he expressed gratitude to Merk for not sending him to the stands when he could have), the UEFA Euro 2000 (3), the 2002 FIFA World Cup (2) and the UEFA Euro 2004 (3). In that tournament, he also whistled the final, becoming the first German referee since Rudi Glöckner of East Germany in 1970, to helm a World Cup or European Championship Finals. His assistants were Jan-Hendrik Salver and Christian Schräer. Merk also refereed the 1997 UEFA Cup Winners' Cup final, and the 2003 UEFA Champions League final. He was the referee in the semi final of the 2003 FIFA Confederations Cup between Cameroon and Colombia, a game remembered for the death of Marc-Vivien Foé.

In the 2006 World Cup, he whistled three matches. The United States vs. Ghana game was the last game in the 2006 World Cup for Merk, as he was not chosen to referee any of the games in the knockout stages. Merk was highly critical of the whole FIFA refereeing process after that, stating in the German sports TV show das aktuelle Sportstudio, it "robbed me two weeks of my life" being forced to stay in the referee camp without a call-up, and adding a mere two was a bitterly meagre payoff regarding the fact he (among others) had to visit countless seminars and were sent on small junior tournaments all over the world to merely assist, comparing it to as if Ronaldinho would have to agree to sit on the bench for the Brazilian U 20 in order to qualify for the World Cup.

Merk is also a long-time proponent of instant video replay to judge critical scenes. On 1 March 2008, Werder Bremen striker Markus Rosenberg scored a goal from clear offside position; Merk initially gave the goal, but immediately after that realised it was illegal, but it was too late to retract his error. He called it "the most bitter moment of my career" and called for introduction of instant replay.

Accolades
 DFB German Referee of the Year: 1995, 1996, 2000, 2003, 2004, 2006
 Bundesverdienstkreuz (major order of merit of the Federal Republic of Germany): 2005

Charity
The religious Merk is active helping slums in India, providing basic dental care for the poor since 1991. He helps the Indienhilfe Kaiserslautern, which erects schools and housing for the homeless, as well as offering basic medical care.

Personal life
Merk was born in Kaiserslautern. A dentist by trade, he lives in Otterbach with his wife and son. He was a professional dentist until 2005, when he stopped practising because of his opposition to the Praxisgebühr, a quarterly fee for patients consulting doctors. Today, he leads motivational seminars. During his youth and teens, Merk suffered ridicule because of his high-pitched, squeaky voice. After undergoing extensive speech therapy, he now talks in a normal baritone.

Merk is also one of the fittest referees in the game. He regularly laps his colleagues in the annual fitness tests, and his personal best for a marathon is 2:42. He is also a dedicated triathlete.

As a side note, "Merk" is the imperative form of the German verb "merken" (to notice, to keep in mind). For this reason, his homepage is named merk-es-dir.de ("keep-it-in-mind.de").

Literature
 Markus Merk: BeWEGEnd
 Markus Merk: Untersuchungen zur Formänderung kalt- und heißpolymerisierender Prothesenkunststoffe nach Behandlung im Ultraschallbad ("Examinations on the form change of cold- and hot-polymerising prothesis plastics after ultrasound treatment"), Dissertation by Markus Merk, University of Cologne, 1990.

References

External links
 Profile at worldfootball.net
 Markus Merk's homepage (German)
 FIFA Profile
 DFB: Markus Merk
 Fanclub 1. FCK: Markus Merk's India charity

1962 births
German dentists
Living people
German football referees
2006 FIFA World Cup referees
Recipients of the Cross of the Order of Merit of the Federal Republic of Germany
2002 FIFA World Cup referees
UEFA Champions League referees
Olympic football referees
UEFA Euro 2000 referees
UEFA Euro 2004 referees
UEFA Europa League referees
UEFA European Championship final referees